Five Brothers or The Five Brothers may refer to:
 "Five Brothers", The Unit episode
 "Five Brothers", jazz standard by Gerry Mulligan
 "Five Brothers", western song first recorded on More Gunfighter Ballads and Trail Songs by Marty Robbins
 Five Brothers, official blog of Mitt Romney presidential campaign, 2008
 Five Brothers, a brand of pasta sauces introduced by Unilever, now sold by Bertolli
 The Five Brothers, a boat built by Harry Clasper

See also
 Brothers Five, 1970 wuxia film
 The Five Chinese Brothers, 1938 children's book